The following is a list of women who have held the Señorita Panamá (Miss Panamá) title.

Representatives to Miss Universe
Señorita Panamá winners who have gone on to become Miss Universe are in bold.

Regional rankings

The regional ranking is established according to the state of origin or representation of the miss (Miss Universe) and the year they won the title.

Notes:

The regional ranking is established according to the state of origin or representation of the miss and the year they won the title.
In the 2007 Sorangel Matos compite for Panama in Miss Universe 2007. She was 1st Runner-Up of the Señorita Panamá 2006 pageant

Representatives to Miss World

References

External links
 Señorita Panamá
 Miss Panamá y Bellezas Universales (Foro Oficial)

Senorita Panama titleholders
Senorita Panama titleholders
Senorita Panama titleholders

nl:Miss Panamá